Gazoryctra sciophanes is a moth of the family Hepialidae. It is known from the United States, including North Carolina and Tennessee.

The wingspan is about 35–38 mm.

References

Moths described in 1979
Hepialidae
Moths of North America